The Outcome is a 2005 Spanish drama film directed by Juan Pinzás. It is the 31st Dogme 95 film. It was entered into the 27th Moscow International Film Festival. It also won the Jury Special Prize at the New York International Latino Film Festival.

Plot

Cast
 Carlos Bardem as Rosendo
 Isabel del Toro
 Fernando Epelde as Paralítico
 Javier Gurruchaga
 Miguel Insua
 Beatriz Rico
 José Rodríguez as Pianista
 Víctor Rueda as Fabio
 José Sancho

See also
 List of Spanish films of 2005

References

External links
 

2005 films
2005 drama films
Spanish drama films
2000s Spanish-language films
Dogme 95 films
2000s Spanish films